The Amazing Race 29 is the twenty-ninth season of the American reality television show The Amazing Race. Unlike previous seasons, which almost exclusively featured teams with pre-existing relationships, this season featured 22 contestants who were all complete strangers who met for the first time and formed eleven teams of two at the starting line. These teams competed in a race around the world.

The season premiered on CBS on Thursday, March 30, 2017, and the season finale aired on June 1, 2017.

Brooke Camhi and Scott Flanary were the winners of this season, while Tara Carr and Joey Corvino finished in second place, and London Kaye and Logan Bauer finished in third.

Production

Development and filming

In March 2016, CBS renewed The Amazing Race for the 2016–17 season, but it was left off the fall schedule for the first time since season 12. It was announced in November 2016 that the season would premiere on Friday, April 21, 2017, in its regular Friday time slot after MacGyver finished its season run. On March 10, 2017, CBS announced that it was moving its low-rated new drama Training Day to Saturdays and would move the season premiere up to March 30.

Filming began on June 10, 2016, in Los Angeles, and concluded on July 2, 2016, in Chicago.

This season also introduced a few alterations to the show's rules. While the traditional limit on Roadblock performances was still enforced, there was an additional requirement for this season wherein team members could not perform more than four Roadblocks before the ninth leg. Additionally, there was no limit on how many times a team could use the U-Turn on this season.

Cast
Winter X Games snowboarder Matt Ladley was one of the twenty-two individuals included in this season's cast. The contestants were all strangers to each other who met for the first time at the starting line where they paired up into impromptu teams.

Future appearances
Becca & Floyd returned to compete on The Amazing Race: Reality Showdown. In 2020, Jenn Lee appeared on the thirty-fifth season of The Challenge.

Results
The following teams are listed with their placements in each leg. Placements are listed in finishing order. 
A  placement with a dagger indicates that the team was eliminated. 
An  placement with a double-dagger indicates that the team was the last to arrive at a pit stop in a non-elimination leg, and had to perform a Speed Bump task in the following leg. 
An italicized and underlined placement indicates that the team was the last to arrive at a pit stop, but there was no rest period at the pit stop and all teams were instructed to continue racing. There was no required Speed Bump task in the next leg.
 A  indicates that the team won the Fast Forward. 
 A  indicates that the team used the U-Turn and a  indicates the team on the receiving end of the U-Turn.

Notes

Race summary

Leg 1 (United States → Panama)

Episode 1: "We're Coming For You, Phil!" (March 30, 2017)
Prize: The Express Pass (found by Becca & Floyd in one of their suitcases after the initial challenge)
Eliminated: Kevin & Jenn
Locations
Los Angeles, California (Grand Hope Park) (Starting Line)
Los Angeles (F&M Gallery – Luggage Shop)
 Los Angeles → Panama City, Panama
Panama City (Panama Canal – Miraflores Locks)
Soberanía National Park (Panama Rainforest Discovery Center – Canopy Tower)
Gamboa (Gamboa Rainforest Resort) 
Panama City (Cinta Costera III) 
Episode summary
Twenty-two contestants, all of whom were total strangers to each other, assembled at the starting line in Grand Hope Park. Phil Keoghan gave them a series of cardinal directions with distances and instructions to find a nearby luggage shop. At the shop, they had to retrieve a suitcase tagged with the flag of Panama and return to the starting line. The contestants were ranked in the order in which they completed this task. Teams were then formed by having the highest-ranked contestant choose their teammate from among the remaining unpaired contestants, and so on. Furthermore, one of the 22 suitcases contained the only available Express Pass. Becca & Floyd found the Express Pass in one of their suitcases.
Once the teams were formed, they had to travel by taxi to Los Angeles International Airport and book one of two Copa Airlines flights to Panama City, Panama. The first flight carried five teams and was scheduled to arrive 90 minutes before the second flight, which carried the remaining six teams. As a consolation prize for being paired together by default, Jessie & Francesca were driven to the airport by Phil Keoghan himself. 
Once in Panama City, teams had to drive themselves to the Miraflores Locks, where they found their next clue, which instructed them to search the canopy tower of the Panama Rainforest Discovery Center for their next clue.
 This season's first Detour was a choice between Scoot or Shoot. Both options required teams to paddle a traditional Panamanian vessel called a cayuco. In Scoot, teams had to beat a pair of professional canoers in a  regatta in order to receive their next clue. Teams who lost on the first attempt received a 50-meter head start for their second attempt, and teams that needed a third attempt were given a 100-meter head start. In Shoot, teams had to row to a marshy area and use a bow and arrow to shoot down two silver fish hanging on a cluster of bamboo poles in order to receive their next clue.
Teams had to check in at the pit stop: the Cinta Costera III in Panama City.

Leg 2 (Panama → Brazil)

Episode 2: "Scared Spitless" (April 6, 2017)
Prize: A trip for two to Barbados (awarded to Liz & Michael)
Eliminated: Jessie & Francesca
Locations
Panama City (Cinta Costera III) 
 Panama City → São Paulo, Brazil
 São Paulo (Helipark Táxi Aéreo e Manutenção Aeronáutica → Maksoud Plaza)
São Paulo (Praça da Sé)
São Paulo (Rua General Osório  Rua Palmorino Mônaco) 
São Paulo (Paulista Avenue)
São Paulo (Instituto Cervantes São Paulo) 
São Paulo (Trianon Park) 
Episode summary
At the beginning of this leg, teams were instructed to fly to São Paulo, Brazil. Once there, teams had to sign up for a helicopter ride across São Paulo to a building adjacent to the Praça da Sé, where they found their next clue.
 This leg's Detour was a choice between Keep The Beat or Work Your Feet. In Keep The Beat, teams traveled to Rua General Osório and performed a musical routine with a samba group. One team member had to perform on the surdo drum and the other had to perform with the chocalho jingle stick to the satisfaction of the band leader in order to receive their next clue. In Work Your Feet, teams traveled to a stretch of Rua Palmorino Mônaco beneath an overpass where they had to assemble makeshift workout equipment using rudimentary supplies to the satisfaction of a professional boxer in order to receive their next clue.
After completing the Detour, teams had to find a woman with a red and yellow scarf riding a bicycle in the pedestrian zone of Paulista Avenue, who handed them their next clue.
 In this season's first Roadblock, one team member had to rappel down the façade of the Instituto Cervantes São Paulo and completely wash a marked window in order to receive their next clue.
Teams had to check in at the pit stop: Trianon Park in São Paulo.

Leg 3 (Brazil → Tanzania)

Episode 3: "Bucket List Type Stuff" (April 13, 2017)
Prize: A trip for two to Amsterdam, Netherlands (awarded to Liz & Michael)
Eliminated: Seth & Olive
Locations
São Paulo (Trianon Park) 
 São Paulo → Dar es Salaam, Tanzania
Dar es Salaam (Askari Monument)
 Dar es Salaam → Zanzibar City, Zanzibar
Mkokotoni (Mkokotoni Market)  
Zanzibar City (Stone Town – Darajani Market) 
Zanzibar City (Stone Town – Emerson on Hurumzi Rooftop Tea House) 
Episode summary
At the beginning of this leg, teams were instructed to fly to Dar es Salaam, Tanzania. Once there, teams had to find the Askari Monument, where they had to search through the classifieds of a newspaper for one with a picture of a boat instructing them to travel by ferry to Zanzibar.
 This leg's Detour was a choice between Build It or Weave It. In Build It, teams had to build a wooden desk in an outdoor workshop. Once the desk was built to the carpenter's standards, they had to deliver it to a nearby school, where they then learned Swahili greetings from the teacher. After teams could correctly recite four phrases, they received their next clue. In Weave It, teams had to observe a climber harvest coconut leaves from a tall palm tree. They then had to use the leaves to weave a basket as demonstrated in order to receive their next clue.
 In this leg's Roadblock at Darajani Market, one team member received a shopping list of local food items with some of the items written in Swahili. They had to purchase all of the items and give the ingredients to the chef outside of the market in order to receive their next clue.
Teams had to check in at the pit stop: the Emerson on Hurumzi Rooftop Tea House in Stone Town.
Additional notes
 This leg featured a Double U-Turn. Tara & Joey chose to use the U-Turn on Seth & Olive, while Vanck & Ashton chose to use the U-Turn on Matt & Redmond.

Leg 4 (Tanzania)

Episode 4: "Another One Bites the Dust" (April 20, 2017)
Prize: US$5,000 each (awarded to Tara & Joey)
Eliminated: Shamir & Sara
Locations
Zanzibar City (Stone Town – Emerson on Hurumzi Rooftop Tea House) 
Zanzibar City (Stone Town – Mercury House)
Zanzibar City (Stone Town – Al-Tamimi Curio Shop  Soko Muhogo Street, House of Wonders, Hurumzi Street & Gizenga Street) 
 Zanzibar City → Dar es Salaam
Dar es Salaam (DASICO Umasida Dispensary) 
Dar es Salaam (Msasani – Coco Beach) 
Episode summary
At the start of this leg, teams were instructed to find the house of "Farrokh Bulsara", whom they had to figure out was actually Freddie Mercury, and then travel to his childhood house in Stone Town for their next clue.
 This leg's Detour was a choice between Lock or Knock. In Lock, teams had to go to the Al-Tamimi Curio Shop and look through artisanal wooden chests, each one carved with a secret compartment into the main drawer, for a key with an attached piece of paper showing a symbol. Once teams found the key, they had to find a cabinet with the same symbol and unlock it in order to release their next clue. In Knock, teams had to travel through the streets of Stone Town to locate three royal doors, which were distinguished by the carving of a lion, serpent, and falcon, and knock on each of them in order to receive a wooden carving. After collecting all three carvings, teams then had to deliver them to a shop on Gizenga Street in order to receive their next clue.
After completing the Detour, teams had to travel by ferry back to Dar es Salaam.
 In this leg's Roadblock, one team member had to correctly make a ladle strainer out of sheet metal in order to receive their next clue.
Teams had to check in at the pit stop: Coco Beach.
Additional notes
Shamir & Sara were unable to complete the Roadblock. After all of the other teams had already checked in at the pit stop, Phil went to the Roadblock to inform them of their elimination.

Leg 5 (Tanzania → Norway)

Episode 5: "Have Faith in Me, Broski" (April 20, 2017)
Locations
Dar es Salaam (Msasani – Coco Beach) 
 Dar es Salaam → Ålesund, Norway
Godøy (Høgsteinen Fyr Lighthouse ) 
 Geiranger (Geirangerfjord) 
Slinningen (Slinningsbålet ) 
Ålesund (Downtown Ålesund  Kayak More Tomorrow & Brosundet Canal) 
Ålesund (Mount Aksla ) 
Episode summary
At the beginning of this leg, teams were instructed to fly to Ålesund, Norway. Once there, teams had to travel to the Høgsteinen Fyr Lighthouse in Godøy, where they had to consume a Norwegian dish known as rakfisk before receiving their next clue.
Becca & Floyd won the Fast Forward.
 In this leg's Roadblock, one team member had to climb the side of a 13-story tower made out of 31,000 wooden pallets, and then nail down one pallet at the top of the stack to help create the world's tallest bonfire festival called a Slinningsbålet. Once complete, teams received their next clue.
 This leg's Detour was a choice between Trolls or Troll. In Trolls, teams had to go to the Kulturhus in downtown Ålesund, where an actress gave them a scroll containing a poem and a map of the town highlighting six images of sculptures. Using the map, they had to locate each building with the corresponding sculpture, and at each location, they had to recite the poem at the doorway, where a troll gave them a large fake firework. Once they returned to the Kulturhus with all six fireworks, they received a scroll with the name of the next pit stop. In Troll, teams had to travel to Kayak More Tomorrow and paddle a kayak along Brosundet Canal to search among fishing lures for one imprinted with the name of the next pit stop.
Teams had to check in at the pit stop: Mount Aksla.
Additional notes
Becca & Floyd's Express Pass expired at the end of this leg; they never ended up using it since they opted to go for the Fast Forward.
There was no elimination at the end of this leg; all teams were instead instructed to continue racing.

Leg 6 (Norway → Italy)

Episode 6: "Double U-Turn Ahead" (April 27, 2017)
Prize: A trip for two to Ushuaia, Argentina (awarded to Becca & Floyd)
Eliminated: Vanck & Ashton
Locations
 Åndalsnes → Oslo
 Oslo → Milan, Italy
Milan (Piazza Fontana)
Milan (ATMosfera Tram Ristorante) 
 Cernobbio → Varenna
Varenna (Greenway dei Patriarchi) 
Perledo (Castello di Vezio)  Menaggio (L'Angolo Benedetto Castelli) 
 Tremezzo (Teresio Olivelli Park) 
Episode summary
At the beginning of this leg, teams were instructed to travel by train to Oslo, and then fly to Milan, Italy. Once in Milan, teams had to find their next clue at the Piazza Fontana.
 In this leg's Roadblock, one team member had to ride the ATMosfera Tram Ristorante, a dining tram in downtown Milan, and find three marked words along the ride (Cernobbio, Concordia, and Lago). During the ride, they had to consume a plate of gnocchi and eggplant parmigiana. At the end of the ride, they had to recite the three correct words to the tram conductor in order to receive their next clue. If they couldn't, they had to perform the task again.
At Cernobbio, teams had to claim a departure time the following morning, and then travel by ferry to Varenna. The next morning, teams opened their next clue at the Varenna Ferry Terminal, which told them to travel to a garden along Greenway dei Patriarchi, where they found their next clue.
 This leg's Detour was a choice between Make a Mold or Grab a Hold. In Make a Mold, teams had to travel to Castello di Vezio and assemble a ghost figure by using one teammate as a wire mesh mold for a plaster mold casting. After the plaster solidified to create the figure, teams were given their next clue. In Grab a Hold, teams had to travel to the village of Menaggio and find L'Angolo Benedetto Castelli, where one team member had to climb  up the face of a rock to retrieve their next clue while their partner belayed the line from the bottom.
After finishing the Detour, teams had to travel to Tremezzo to find the pit stop along the shoreline at the Teresio Olivelli Park, overlooking Lake Como.
Additional notes
 This leg featured a Double U-Turn. Liz & Michael chose to use the U-Turn on Vanck & Ashton, while Becca & Floyd chose to use the U-Turn on Liz & Michael. However, Liz & Michael had already passed the U-Turn by this point and were therefore unaffected.

Leg 7 (Italy)

Episode 7: "Have Fun and Get It Done" (May 4, 2017)
Prize: A trip for two to Grenada (awarded to Matt & Redmond)
Locations
Cernobbio (Piazza Risorgimento – Monumento ai Caduti) 
 Cernobbio → Venice
 Venice (Piazza San Marco)
Venice (Trattoria al Ponte del Megio  Campo San Polo) 
 Venice (Ca' Zenobio) 
Venice (Campo San Vio ) 
Episode summary
At the beginning of this leg, teams boarded one of two buses to Venice. Once in Venice, teams had to take a water taxi to Piazza San Marco and find a spazzino, a local street-sweeper, who handed them their next clue.
 This leg's Detour was a choice between Sing It or Bring It. In Sing It, teams had to dress as gondoliers, learn a traditional Italian serenade called "La Biondina in Gondoleta", and then perform the song aboard a gondola along the Grand Canal to the satisfaction of the mandolin player in order to receive their next clue. In Bring It, teams had to work as porters by stacking a dolly with suitcases and then navigating through the stairs and narrow alleys to deliver them to the hotel listed on the luggage tags in order to receive their next clue.
 In this leg's Roadblock, one team member had to choose an actor from a Venetian masquerade performance and paint an exact copy of their mask in order to receive their next clue.
Teams had to check in at the pit stop: Campo San Vio in Venice.
Additional notes
This was a non-elimination leg.

Leg 8 (Italy → Greece)

Episode 8: "Good Job, Donkey" (May 11, 2017)
Prize: US$7,500 each (awarded to Tara & Joey)
Eliminated: Liz & Michael
Locations
Venice (Ponte della Costituzione) 
 Venice → Bari
 Bari → Patras, Greece
Arachova (Kaplanis Taverna) 
Arachova (Streets of Arachova  Egarsios Steps & Church of Saint George ) 
Athens (Panathenaic Stadium)
Athens (Kantina Food Truck) 
Athens (Zappeion) 
Athens (Areopagus) 
Episode summary
At the beginning of this leg, teams were instructed to fly to Bari and then travel by ferry to Patras, Greece. Once in Greece, teams had to find their next clue at the Kaplanis Taverna in Arachova.
 This leg's Detour was a choice between For the Bride or For the Groom. In For the Bride, teams had to transport two containers of sheep milk on a donkey through the streets of Arachova to find local cheese makers and exchange each container for a piece of cheese. Both cheeses then had to be delivered to a bride in exchange for their next clue. In For the Groom, teams had to compete in a footrace with locals up the 252 Egarsios Steps leading to the Church of Saint George, where they had to find a shepherd who gave them a sheep and a goat to deliver to the groom in exchange for their next clue. After completing either Detour, teams received a plate, which they had to break in order to find their next clue baked inside.
After completing the Detour, teams traveled to the Panathenaic Stadium in Athens, where they had to run one complete victory lap around the track in order to receive their next clue.
 For their Speed Bump, Liz & Michael had to prepare a traditional skewered dish called kokoretsi by wrapping sections of meat with intestines in a nearby food truck before they could continue racing.
 In this leg's Roadblock, one team member had to learn how to perform the changing of the guard routine of the Greek Presidential Guards, known as Evzones, that takes place outside the Tomb of the Unknown Soldier. They had to perform it inside the Zappeion Hall in sync with an Evzone and to the satisfaction of a command instructor in order to receive their next clue.
Teams had to check in at the pit stop: the Areopagus, beneath the Acropolis in Athens.
Additional notes
 This leg featured a Double U-Turn. Brooke & Scott chose to use the U-Turn on Liz & Michael, while Tara & Joey chose to use the U-Turn on Becca & Floyd.

Leg 9 (Greece → Vietnam)

Episode 9: "I Thought We Were Playing It Nice" (May 18, 2017)
Prize: A trip for two to Galapagos Islands (awarded to Becca & Floyd)
Locations
Athens (Volterou Street) 
Corinth (Corinth Canal – Old Bridge) 
 Athens → Hanoi, Vietnam
Hanoi (Tượng Đài Lý Thái Tổ )
Hanoi (Quán Sứ Temple)
Hanoi (Hoàn Kiếm District – 42 Hàng Vải Street & 56 Cầu Gỗ Street  41 Cửa Nam Street & Chân Cầm Street) 
Hanoi (Thống Nhất Park ) 
Episode summary
At the beginning of this leg, teams had to travel to the Corinth Canal in order to find their next clue.
Teams were instructed to fly to Hanoi, Vietnam. Once in Hanoi, teams had to search among a group of dancers waving fans at Tượng Đài Lý Thái Tổ. When they found a fan with a yellow marker, the dancer gave them their next clue, which directed teams to the Quán Sứ Temple.
 This season's final Detour was a choice between Bamboo Climb or Window Design. In Bamboo Climb, teams had to transport a 15-foot ladder made of bamboo through the busy streets to an apartment building and get it up a narrow stairwell. On the roof, they had to use the ladder to retrieve a birdcage, and then return both the cage and the ladder to the starting point in order to receive their next clue. In Window Design, teams had to carry three mannequins through the streets to a clothing shop, where they had to dress and arrange them in the window to match a provided photo in order to receive their next clue.
Teams had to check in at the pit stop: Thống Nhất Park in Hanoi.
Additional notes
This was a non-elimination leg.

Leg 10 (Vietnam)

Episode 10: "Riding a Bike Is Like Riding a Bike" (May 18, 2017)
Prize: A trip for two to Costa Rica (awarded to Matt & Redmond)
Eliminated: Becca & Floyd
Locations
Hanoi (Thống Nhất Park ) 
 Hanoi → Ninh Bình
Hoa Lư (Tam Cốc Wharf)
 Hoa Lư (Bích Động Temple) 
 Hoa Lư (Thôn Hải Nham ) 
 Hoa Lư (Đền Thái Vi – Bến Thành )
 Hoa Lư (Tam Cốc Wharf)
Hoa Lư (Tam Cốc – Hang Múa Peak) 
Episode summary
At the beginning of this leg, teams were instructed to travel by bus to Ninh Bình. Once there, teams made their way to the nearby Tam Cốc Wharf, where they chose two bicycles, which then would be their only means of transportation for most of the leg. 
At Bích Động Temple, teams had to search the grounds for their next clue and a Travelocity Roaming Gnome, which they had to keep with them for the remainder of the leg.
 For their Speed Bump, Tara & Joey had to collect 72 duck eggs from around a pond before they could continue racing.
 This leg's Roadblock was a Switchback from season 3, where one team member had to load a bicycle with a certain number of large and small shrimp traps and deliver them to a fisherman  down the road in order to receive their next clue.
At Bến Thành, teams had to collect and deliver an offering of specified prayer items up the Ngô Đồng River to a ceremonial dragon boat. One team member had to row the oars using the traditional method of only using their feet. Once they delivered their offering, they returned to the pier, accompanied by their respective dragon boat, and received their next clue.
Before reaching the pit stop, teams had to climb approximately 500 steps along the Lying Dragon Mountain (Núi Ngọa Long) trail to the top of Hang Múa Peak.
Additional notes
On the way to Đền Thái Vi, Floyd became dizzy due to fatigue and medics were called out. After all of the other teams had already checked in at the pit stop, Phil came out to their location to inform them of their elimination.
Legs 9 and 10 aired back-to-back as a special two-hour episode.

Leg 11 (Vietnam → South Korea)

Episode 11: "As Easy As Stacking Cups" (May 25, 2017)
Eliminated: Matt & Redmond
Locations
Hoa Lư (Hidden Charm Hotel) 
 Hanoi → Seoul, South Korea
Seoul (Gangnam District – Gangnam Station)
Seoul (Hanyang University Olympic Gymnasium) 
Seoul (Mugyewon Arts & Cultural Center )
Seoul (OGN e-Stadium ) 
Seoul (Sebitseom – Gavit Some Roof Garden) 
Episode summary
At the beginning of this leg, teams were instructed to fly to Seoul, South Korea. Once there, teams had to find an outdoor K-pop performance in the Gangnam District in order to receive their next clue.
 In this leg's first Roadblock, one team member had to take part in sport stacking by quickly arranging cups into three specified formations within seven seconds in order to receive their next clue.
At the Mugyewon Arts & Cultural Center, teams had to prepare the traditional dish kimchi after watching a silent demonstration. Once approved, they had to transfer it to a jar and then bury the closed jar in soil to allow for fermentation. Lastly, after tasting some kimchi, teams received their next clue.
 In this season's final Roadblock, the team member who did not perform the previous Roadblock had to play the video game Street Fighter V against a professional video game player, which included Seon-woo "Infiltration" Lee and Lee Chung "Poongko" Gon, and defeat the professional gamer in one round of the game in order to receive their next clue. After every 10 rounds, the professional gamer received a disadvantage: after 10 rounds, he had to play with only one hand; after 20 rounds, blindfolded; and after 30 rounds, blindfolded and with only one hand.
Teams had to check in at the pit stop: the Gavit Some Roof Garden on Sebitseom in Seoul.

Leg 12 (South Korea → United States)

Episode 12: "We're Going To Victory Lane" (June 1, 2017)
Winners: Brooke & Scott
Second Place: Tara & Joey
Third Place: London & Logan
Locations
Seoul (Sebitseom – Gavit Some Roof Garden) 
 Seoul → Chicago, Illinois
Chicago (O'Hare International Airport) (Unaired)
Joliet (Chicagoland Speedway)
Chicago (Monroe Street Station)
Chicago (Chicago Water Tower, Buckingham Fountain & Wabash Avenue Bridge)
Chicago (City Hall Rooftop)
Chicago (Wrigleyville Dogs)
Chicago (Wrigley Rooftops – 3639 North Sheffield Avenue)
Chicago (Wrigley Field)
Chicago (Milton Lee Olive Park) 
Episode summary
At the beginning of this leg, teams were instructed to fly to Chicago, Illinois. Once there, teams had to make their way to the Chicagoland Speedway, where one team member had to join a pit crew and change one tire on a race car in 40 seconds or less. Their partner then had to drive one lap around the track in 48 seconds or less. Once both tasks were completed, they could receive their next clue at the winner's podium.
At the Monroe Street Station, teams had to search the train platform for a city worker with their next clue, which contained three riddles that teams had to figure out represented three locations within Downtown Chicago: the Chicago Water Tower, Buckingham Fountain, and the Wabash Avenue Bridge. At each of these locations, they received a postcard. Putting the three postcards together spelled out their next destination: the City Hall Rooftop. There, teams had to locate the rooftop garden, where the city's beekeeper handed them their next clue in exchange for the postcards.
At Wrigleyville Dogs, teams had to make ten Chicago-style hot dogs and deliver them to the roof of 3639 North Sheffield Avenue, one of the Wrigley Rooftops, where a group of Chicago Cubs fans were waiting. After delivering the hot dogs, season 19 winners Ernie & Cindy handed teams tickets to enter Wrigley Field through the marquee entrance, where they found their next clue.
At Wrigley Field, one team member had to go inside the press box while the other had to enter the stadium's hand-operated scoreboard, which displayed the locations of the eleven pit stops in alphabetical order. Unable to see the locations displayed on the scoreboard, the team member inside the scoreboard had to install numbered signs in the proper locations on the multi-level structure to indicate their placement at each pit stop, guided by their partner giving instructions from the press box via one-way radio. Once their placements were correct, they had to go to home plate, where an umpire handed them a worksheet with equations based on their placements throughout the season. The solution provided them a three-digit number corresponding to the section of seats where they found their final clue, which directed them to the finish line at Milton Lee Olive Park.
{| class="wikitable unsortable" style="text-align:center;"
|-
! scope="col" rowspan="2" | Pit Stop City
! scope="col" rowspan="2" | Country
! scope="col" rowspan="2" | Leg
! scope="col" colspan="3" | Placements
|-
! style="background: red;" | 
! style="background: white;" | Tara& Joey
! style="background: blue;" | 
|-
! scope="row" | Ålesund
|Norway
|5
|5th
|1st
|6th
|-
! scope="row" | Athens
|Greece
|8
|4th
|1st
|3rd
|-
! scope="row" | Dar es Salaam
|Tanzania
|4
|5th
|1st
|7th
|-
! scope="row" | Hanoi
|Vietnam
|9
|3rd
|5th
|4th
|-
! scope="row" | Lake Como
|Italy
|6
|6th
|3rd
|5th
|-
! scope="row" | Ninh Bình
|Vietnam
|10
|4th
|3rd
|2nd
|-
! scope="row" | Panama City
|Panama
|1
|8th
|6th
|4th
|-
! scope="row" | São Paulo
|Brazil
|2
|8th
|7th
|6th
|-
! scope="row" | Seoul
|South Korea
|11
|2nd
|3rd
|1st
|-
! scope="row" | Venice
|Italy
|7
|5th
|3rd
|4th
|-
! scope="row" | Zanzibar
|Tanzania
|3
|5th
|2nd
|6th
|}
Additional notes
At O'Hare International Airport, teams had to search for a woman in a red hat who had their next clue. This segment was unaired.

Reception

Critical response
The Amazing Race 29 received mostly positive reviews. Andy Dehnart of reality blurred wrote that the twist of casting individuals was able to refresh the format of The Amazing Race and the season "delivered a cast that has consistently delivered." Mikey Glazer of TheWrap wrote that the format of this season worked because "unlike previous seasons where the two-person teams often suffered from one clunker team member — camouflaged in the edit under proverbial team nicknames like 'the frat boys' or 'the dancers' — each of the 22 racers on this season was identifiable, memorable and got a full story arc." Lincee Ray of Entertainment Weekly praised how this format was able to deliver "highly entertaining" teams like Brooke & Scott due to their love/hate relationship. Conversely, Ken Tucker of Yahoo! called this season "dire" as the format led to teams that either got along well or despised each other and said that he wasn't rooting for anyone to win.

Ratings
U.S. Nielsen ratings

Canadian ratings
Canadian broadcaster CTV also aired The Amazing Race on Thursdays.

Canadian DVR ratings are included in Numeris's count.

References

External links

 29
2017 American television seasons
Television shows filmed in Los Angeles
Television shows filmed in Panama
Television shows filmed in São Paulo (state)
Television shows filmed in Tanzania
Television shows filmed in Norway
Television shows filmed in Italy
Television shows filmed in Greece
Television shows filmed in Vietnam
Television shows filmed in South Korea
Television shows filmed in Illinois